Córdoba Province was one of the provinces of Colombia, it belonged to Antioquia State.

Provinces of the Republic of New Granada
History of Colombia